The following is a list of the IRMA's number-one singles of 1992.

16 number ones
 Most number ones: All artists one number one each
Most weeks at number one (single): "Rhythm is a Dancer" - Snap! (8 weeks)
Most weeks at number one (artist): Snap! (8 weeks)

See also
1992 in music
List of artists who reached number one in Ireland

1992 in Irish music
1992 record charts
1992